Athletes from the Netherlands competed at the 1936 Winter Olympics in Garmisch-Partenkirchen, Germany.

Alpine skiing

Women

Bobsleigh

Men

Speed skating

Men

References

Olympic Winter Games 1936, full results by sports-reference.com

Nations at the 1936 Winter Olympics
1936
Olympics